Communist Party (Reconstructed), initially known as Portuguese Communist Party (Reconstructed), was a political party in Portugal.

History

PCP(R) was founded at a unitary congress in December 1975, through the fusion of the Portuguese Marxist-Leninist Communist Organization, the Portuguese Marxist-Leninist Committee and the Organization for the Reconstruction of the Communist Party (Marxist-Leninist).

PCP(R) held its second congress in 1977.

After the break between China and Albania, PCP(R) sided with the Albanian Party of Labour. The Communist Party of Brazil had a strong influence over PCP(R).

PC(R) published Bandeira Vermelha.

The youth league of PCP(R)/PC(R) was the Revolutionary Young Communist League (UJCR).

In 1992 PC(R) was renamed Communists for Democracy and Progress (Comunistas pela Democracia e Progresso). In 1995 CDP merged into the People's Democratic Union.

Election results

References

Hoxhaist parties
Defunct communist parties in Portugal
Political parties established in 1975
1975 establishments in Portugal
Political parties disestablished in 1992